"Any Last Werdz" is the second and final single from Eazy-E's EP, It's On (Dr. Dre) 187um Killa. It features Kokane and Cold 187um.

The single was released in 1994 as the follow-up to the popular "Real Muthaphuckkin G's" and was written by Eazy-E, Dirty Red and produced by Above the Law's Cold 187 um.  Any Last Werdz did find some success on the charts, making it to #69 on the Hot R&B/Hip-Hop Songs and #5 on the Hot Rap Singles. The music video would be his last before his death.

Single Track Listing
"Any Last Werdz" (Car Hop / Gunz) - 5:11 
"Any Last Werdz" (Anotha Murder Version) - 5:11 
"Any Last Werdz" (Street Version) - 5:11 
"Any Last Werdz" (Radio Edit) - 3:30 
"Any Last Werdz" (Car Hop / No Gunz) - 5:11 
"Any Last Werdz" (Instrumental) - 5:11

References

Eazy-E songs
1994 singles
Gangsta rap songs
Horrorcore songs
1993 songs